is a former Japanese football player, manager and politician. He won the bronze medal with the Japan national team at the 1968 Summer Olympics in Mexico City, finishing as the tournament's top scorer with seven goals, and is the all-time leading goalscorer for Japan.

Kamamoto served as the Vice-President of the Japan Football Association from July 1998 to July 2008. In 2005, he was inducted in the Japan Football Hall of Fame.

He also served as a member of the House of Councillors between 1995 and 2001.

Early life 
Kamamoto was born in Kyoto on April 15, 1944. He grew up in Kyoto and attended Yamashiro High School. Then, he joined the Waseda University School of Commerce. For fours years in a row, he was the top scorer in the Kanto university league. He won the 1963 and the 1966 Emperor's Cup while he was at Waseda University. This was the last time a university team won the Emperor's Cup. He earned a bachelor of arts degree in Commerce from Waseda University in 1966.

Club career 
After graduating, Kamamoto joined the Japan Soccer League club Yanmar Diesel in 1967 (currently known as Cerezo Osaka). He played all league games as from his first season. In 1968, he became the top scorer in the Japan Soccer League. Yanmar Diesel won their 1st title, the 1968 Emperor's Cup, with Kamamoto's winning goal in the final. The club also won the 1970 Emperor's Cup. In 1971, for the first time, the club became league champions and Kamamoto became the top scorer for a second time. Between 1974 and 1975, Yanmar Diesel won the league for two years in a row and also won the 1974 Emperor's Cup. In 1978, Kamamoto became a player manager. The club was league champions in 1980. In 1982, Kamamoto ruptured his Achilles tendon twice and, in 1984, when he was 40 years old, he retired. All in all, Kamamoto was top scorer seven times and was selected in the best eleven fourteen times. He was also selected as Japanese Footballer of the Year seven times.

National team career 
On 3 March 1964, when Kamamoto was a Waseda University student, he debuted and scored a goal for the Japan national team against the Singapore national football team. In October, he was selected by Japan for the 1964 Summer Olympics in Tokyo. He played in all matches and scored one goal.

In 1968, Kamamoto was also selected by Japan for the 1968 Summer Olympics in Mexico City, where Japan won the Bronze Medal and Kamamoto was the top scorer. He played in all matches for his country and scored seven goals. In 2018, this team was inducted to the Japan Football Hall of Fame.

Kamamoto played at the Football at the 1966 Asian Games. In the 1970s, after many Olympic players left the national team, he continued being selected. He played at the 1970 and 1974 Asian Games. He retired from the national team in 1977, having played in 76 matches and having scored 75 goals. Kamamoto, however, has been recognized with 80 goals in 84 appearances from the Japan Football Association, and previously as well by FIFA, but he isn't mentioned with this tally in their latest publications.

Coaching career 
In 1978, Kamamoto was a player manager for Yanmar Diesel. He led the club to its first league championship in 1980. The club also won the 1983 and 1984 JSL Cup. In 1984, he retired from football and resigned as the manager of Yanmar Diesel. In 1991, he signed as manager with rivals Matsushita Electric (to be later known as Gamba Osaka). He resigned in 1994.

Other roles 
Kamamoto was selected as a member of the House of Councillors in July 1995 and served until July 2001.

Club statistics

International goals 
Scores and results list Japan's goal tally first.

Managerial statistics

Honours 
Individual
 Summer Olympics football top scorer : 1968
 Japanese Footballer of the Year (7): 1966, 1968, 1971, 1974, 1975, 1980, 1981
 Japan Soccer League Top Scorer (7): 1968, 1970, 1971, 1974, 1975, 1976 (on his own), 1978 (shared with Carvalho).
 Japan Soccer League Best Eleven (14): 1967, 1968, 1969, 1970, 1971, 1972, 1974, 1975, 1976, 1977, 1978, 1979, 1980, 1981.
 Japan Soccer League Assists leader (2): 1973, 1975
 Japan Soccer League Star Ball Award (5): 1967, 1968, 1970, 1971, 1972
 Japan Soccer League Fighting Spirit Award (1): 1968
 Japan Soccer League 100 goals Award: 1974
 Japan Soccer League 200 goals Award: 1981

See also 
 List of men's footballers with 50 or more international goals

References

External links 
 
 
 Japan National Football Team Database
 
 Japan Football Hall of Fame at Japan Football Association
 Japan Football Hall of Fame (Japan team at 1968 Olympics) at Japan Football Association
 Japan Soccer Archive: Biography and action photos

1944 births
Living people
Waseda University alumni
Association football people from Kyoto Prefecture
Japanese footballers
Japan international footballers
Japan Soccer League players
Cerezo Osaka players
Olympic footballers of Japan
Olympic medalists in football
Olympic bronze medalists for Japan
Medalists at the 1968 Summer Olympics
Footballers at the 1964 Summer Olympics
Footballers at the 1968 Summer Olympics
Asian Games medalists in football
Asian Games bronze medalists for Japan
Footballers at the 1966 Asian Games
Footballers at the 1970 Asian Games
Footballers at the 1974 Asian Games
Japanese football managers
J1 League managers
Gamba Osaka managers
Fujieda MYFC managers
Association football forwards
Members of the House of Councillors (Japan)
Japanese sportsperson-politicians
Medalists at the 1966 Asian Games